Gal Fridman (or Friedman, ; born September 16, 1975) is an Israeli windsurfer and Israel's first Olympic gold medalist. Fridman won a Bronze Medal in the Atlanta 1996 Summer Olympics, and his gold medal in the Athens 2004 Summer Olympics. He is the first of two Israelis athlete to win two Olympic Medals, and the first Olympic Gold medalist in Israeli history. His first name, Gal, means "wave" in Hebrew.

He was born in Karkur, Israel, and lives close to the water in Sdot Yam, a nearby kibbutz.

Early life and career
Fridman was born in Karkur, Israel, to an Ashkenazi Jewish family. The second out of three children, Fridman was born to Dganit and Uri Fridman, and has an older sister named Maayan and a younger brother named Yuval. Growing up close to the Mediterranean Sea, Gal was introduced by his father to windsurfing. Fridman started sailing at age seven, and began racing when he was 11. He began competing internationally in youth categories while still at school. After his service in the Israel Defense Forces he began competing as an adult.

In 1995, he won the ASA Boardsailing Championship in Eilat, Israel. In 1999, he won the International ASA Windsurfing Championship in Eilat.  In 2002, he won the Mistral World Championship held in Pattaya, Thailand, and was ranked #1 on the International Sailing Federation rankings in February 2003.

1996 Summer Olympic Games, Atlanta

At the 1996 Summer Olympics, Fridman won a bronze medal for Israel in the Olympic Sailing Windsurfing Event (Mistral Men's Windsurfing category), and was named Israeli Sportsman of the Year.

2000 Summer Olympics, Sydney, Australia

Despite his form in the previous years, he failed to win the Israeli Olympic Trials and did not represent Israel in the Sydney 2000 Olympics. Amit Inbar represented Israel in the 2000 Olympics and finished 7th overall.

2004 Summer Olympics, Athens, Greece

Back on form leading up to the 2004 Olympics, Fridman was one of Israel's Olympic Team favorites to a win a Medal (along with judoka Ariel Zeevi and athlete Aleksander Averbukh), and prepared intensively for the Olympic Games two years prior to the event. At the 2004 Summer Olympics, Fridman again competed in the Olympic Windsurfing Discipline of Sailing (Mistral Windsurfer Class), a discipline that included 11 races.

Fridman was coached by retired Olympic Windsurfing Silver (1992) and bronze medalist (1988) Michael Gebhardt from the US.

(Note: the worst race score is thrown out)

In the last race on August 25, 2004, Fridman finished a hard-fought 2nd, exploiting a tactical mistake made by Brazilian leader Ricardo Santos and beat Greek windsurfer Nikolaos Kaklamanakis in order to end the Olympic Regatta with the lowest score, (42 points) thus earning the 2004 Olympic gold medal in Windsurfing. Olympic Sailing events scores are tabulated with the lowest score (best results combines) winning. Fridman won Israel's first Olympic gold medal.

Fridman dedicated his medal to the memory of the 11 Israeli athletes assassinated by members of the Black September organization during the 1972 Summer Olympics.

Final results

1st- Gal Fridman – Israel (Gold Medal)

2nd- Nikolaos Kaklamanakis – Greece (Silver Medal)

3rd- Nick Dempsey – Great Britain (Bronze Medal)

4th- Ricardo Santos – Brazil

5th- Przemysław Miarczyński – Poland

2008 Summer Olympics, Beijing, China

Approaching the 2008 Beijing Olympics, Fridman found it hard to adjust to the new Olympic Windsurf board model, the RS:X Neil Pryde windsurfer. Also he had some crucial equipment failures at key Olympic trail regattas and failed to qualify for the 2008 Israeli Olympic Sailing Team. Shahar Tzuberi took his place and went on to win the 2008 Olympic bronze medal for Israel.

Later years
Fridman, an avid cyclist, won a gold medal in the Israeli cycling championship in 2005. In 2007, he won the Men's Windsurfer New Year International Regatta in Limassol, Cyprus.

After 2008, Fridman retired from competition in windsurfing and focused on coaching up and coming Israeli Windsurfers. He guided Nimrod Mashiah to the silver medal in the 2009 World Championship.

In June 2005, his Bronze and Gold Olympic Medals were stolen, with only the Gold Medal recovered from the robbery. Fridman currently coaches Israel's top windsurfers preparing for the 2016 RIO Summer Olympics and currently owns a SUP Company. (Stand-Up-Paddle Board) and is involved with helping the SUP Company "Starboard" with SUP R&D and can be found giving motivational speeches worldwide.

Hall of Fame
In 2005, Fridman was named to the International Jewish Sports Hall of Fame.

Achievements

See also

 List of Olympic medalists in sailing
 List of World Championships medalists in sailing (windsurfer classes)
 List of Jews in sports
 Israel at the Olympics
 Sports in Israel

References

External links

 
 
 
 
 Gal Fridman at the Jewish Agency for Israel (archived)
 Gal Fridman at the Jewish Virtual Library
 
 Gal Fridman Achieves Olympic Glory, video at the Olympic Games official website

1975 births
Living people
Israeli Ashkenazi Jews
Israeli windsurfers
Jewish sailors (sport)
Olympic bronze medalists for Israel
Olympic gold medalists for Israel
Olympic medalists in sailing
Olympic sailors of Israel
Israeli male sailors (sport)
People from Pardes Hanna-Karkur
Sailors at the 1996 Summer Olympics – Mistral One Design
Sailors at the 2004 Summer Olympics – Mistral One Design
Medalists at the 2004 Summer Olympics
Medalists at the 1996 Summer Olympics